
The Vale Academy is a co-educational secondary school with academy status on Atherton Way in the market town of Brigg, North Lincolnshire, England.

The Vale Academy is one of two schools in Brigg, the other being Sir John Nelthorpe School, together they operate as the Brigg Sixth Form College.

History

Two secondary modern schools
The school was previously a secondary modern. Building began in 1955. It was to be called Brigg Secondary Modern School, but was called Glanford Secondary School, and cost £110,089, for the Lindsey Education Committee. It was a two-form entry.

There were seven classrooms, two dining rooms, four rooms for woodwork, housecraft, arts and crafts, and science, and a hall and gymnasium. It opened on Thursday 10 January 1957 on Redcombe Road. Another two-form secondary modern school was planned for Broughton. The headteacher was Mr Ernest Urry, the former head of Caistor Secondary Modern School (now Caistor Yarborough Academy) from 1951, and there were 13 teachers and 320 children.

The school was officially opened 6 November 1957 by Colonel Nelthorpe. Ernest Urry died in August 1990, aged 82, in Stamford, Lincolnshire.

The adjoining Brigg Westmoor Secondary opened in September 1959. This school, to the north, was officially opened on Wednesday 21 September 1960 by the Bishop of Lincoln, Kenneth Riches. It cost £110,000, with ten teachers, nine classrooms and 280 children.

In 1972, both schools became Brigg Secondary School.

Comprehensive
It became a comprehensive in September 1976, with around 800 children, on the Westmoor school site. It became a Music and Technology College in 2007. It joined the Schools Partnership Trust and officially became an academy on 1 September 2011.

In 2011 the Vale had GCSE results of 69% at grades A*-C, which was above the local education authority's average of 52%. The students at the school make good progress - in the last two years value added scores for student progress have been positive. The Sixth Form value added score is also positive for progress at 0.22 and A*-C grades at A level have risen to 86%.

In 2013 the school received a Grade 2 (good) rating for overall effectiveness in its Ofsted inspection. This was consolidated with a shorter follow up inspection performed in 2017 where The Academy retained its good rating.

In January 2017, the Vale moved into a new building. The old school buildings of Glanford and Westmoor Schools were demolished later that year along with a 3rd building which was formerly used for PE and Tech lessons.

Admissions

The Vale Academy Admissions Policy conforms to the Local Authority (LA) policy on admissions.

Years 7-11 provide places for approximately 162 pupils per year. At the beginning of the Autumn term of pupils’ final years at primary school, parents are issued with details of the arrangements for transfer to secondary school.  They are invited to visit the schools, and to inspect copies of school prospectuses.  Parents complete a Common Admission Form, (CAF), which is returned to the LA by the end of October in the school year before transfer, and parents receive notification of their child’s allocated school in March of that year. The admission limit at the Vale Academy is currently 162.  This is reviewed annually by the Governing Body. The Vale Academy 2013 admissions status provides openings to all students for all years.

Notable former pupils
Guy Martin - Motorcycle racer and TV presenter.

References

1957 establishments in England
Academies in the Borough of North Lincolnshire
Brigg
Delta schools
Educational institutions established in 1957
Secondary schools in the Borough of North Lincolnshire